The Church of the Holy Transfiguration is a church in Herebel, Dibër County, Albania. Established in the 12th century, it was declared a Cultural Monument of Albania in 1970.

There is an annual celebration at the church, occurring on the 18th and 19th of August. While primarily attended by the Macedonian Christian population, it is also attended by Muslims.

In 2018, a dozen icons were donated to the church by the nearby Saint Jovan Bigorski Monastery.

References

Cultural Monuments of Albania
Buildings and structures in Dibër (municipality)